Zapata High School is a public high school located in Zapata, Texas (USA) and classified as a 4A school by the UIL.  It is part of the Zapata County Independent School District located in central Zapata County.  In 2015, the school was rated "Met Standard" by the Texas Education Agency.

Its boundary parallels that of Zapata County.

Athletics
The Zapata Hawks compete in these sports: JROTC, cross country, volleyball, basketball, powerlifting, soccer, golf, tennis, track, softball, and baseball.

References

External links
 
 Zapata ISD

Public high schools in Texas
Schools in Zapata County, Texas